Markaz College of Arts and Science is an unaided college in Karanthur, Kozhikode, India under the Markazu Ssaqafathi Ssunniyya. affiliated to University of Calicut.

Principals

Current 
 A.K Abdul Hameed

Departments and faculties

Major Departments

Department of English 
 Mrs. T.S. Ujwala
 Mr. Yoosaf C
 Prof. Mahamood Pampally (Retd. Professor- PSMO College)
 Dr. MA Saboor Thangal
 MS. Noorjahan OP

Department of Chemistry 
 Nasheetha Rahman TT
 Muhammed Sharafudheen
 Sahira KP
 Ali Hassan M

Other departments 
 Department of Commerce
 Dr. PM Raghavan (Rtd. Principal- Govt Arts & Science College Calicut)
 Sameer PM
 Divya V
 Dijina T
 Rishin Babu K
 Jabir T

 Department of Mathematics
 Department of Computer Science
 Ajmila Jabir
 Department of Malayalam
 Vinod Kumar KK
 Department of Arabic
  AK Kader (Vice Principal)
 Department of Journalism
 Department of History
 Prof. Somarajan

See also
Sheikh Abubakr Ahmad
 Markazu Saquafathi Sunniyya
 Markaz Knowledge City

References 

Markaz
Arts and Science colleges in Kerala
Universities and colleges in Kozhikode
Science and technology in Kozhikode
Colleges affiliated with the University of Calicut